Nitin Kashinath Raut  is an Indian politician and social activist from Maharashtra. He was a former Cabinet minister in the Uddhav Thackeray ministry, Government of Maharashtra. He is the Working President of the Indian National Congress party Maharashtra and Chairman AICC (All India Congress Committee) for SC Department. He was the Cabinet Minister of Employment Guarantee and Water Conservation in the Government of Maharashtra, India until 2014.

Political career

He was elected to the Maharashtra Legislative Assembly from Nagpur North constituency, in Nagpur district consecutively in the 1999, 2004 and 2009 elections. As of 2014 he served as a Maharashtra Cabinet Minister for Employment Guarantee Scheme and Water Conservation. He was former Minister for Animal Husbandry, Dairy Development, and Fisheries, Home, Jail, State Labor and Excise Department.

Held positions
 1999 – 2004: Member of Maharashtra Legislative Assembly (1st term)
 2004 – 2009: Member of Maharashtra Legislative Assembly (2nd term)
 2008 - 2009 : Maharashtra state minister for Department of Home, Prison, State Labor and Excise 
 2009 – 2014: Member of Maharashtra Legislative Assembly (3rd term)
 2009 - 2014 : Maharashtra Cabinet minister for Horticulture, Fisheries, Animal Husbandry, Dairy Development, Employment Guarantee Scheme and Water Resources
2009-Appointed guardian minister of Yavatmal District
2019 – current: Member of Maharashtra Legislative Assembly (4th term)
 2019 – 2019 : Cabinet minister for Public Works (excluding PSUs), Tribal Development, Women and Child Development, Textiles, Relief and Rehabilitation, Other Backward Classes, Socially and Educationally Backward Classes, Deprived Castes, Nomadic Tribes and Special Backward Classes Welfare
2019 – current: Maharashtra Cabinet Minister for Renewable Energy and Energy Department
2020- Appointed guardian minister of Nagpur district

Other positions 

He became the Vice President of Maharashtra Pradesh Congress Committee (MPCC) in 2001.

He served as the General Secretary MPCC.

He is an active member of the MPCC Core Group and Media Committee.

He began serving as a member of the All India Congress Committee in 2001.

Books and publications
 Buddhist Marriage and Succession Act, 2007
 Dr. Babasaheb Ambedkar's views on Birth Control and its Relevance with Modern India
 Buddhism and Dalit: Social Philosophy and Tradition

Personal life 
His family, inspired by B. R. Ambedkar, follows Buddhism and he strongly believes in Buddhist philosophy.

Social work
Nitin Raut carries out social work through 'Sankalp', an NGO that works to aid Dalits and other downtrodden people. It provides relief to victims of natural and man-made calamities such as floods and communal riots.

References

Marathi politicians
Living people
Politicians from Nagpur
Maharashtra MLAs 2004–2009
Maharashtra MLAs 1999–2004
Maharashtra MLAs 2009–2014
Maharashtra MLAs 2019–2024
Indian Buddhists
20th-century Buddhists
21st-century Buddhists
Indian National Congress politicians
1952 births
Marathi-language writers
English-language writers from India